John Chiles (born October 9, 1988) is a gridiron football wide receiver who is currently a free agent. He was signed by the New Orleans Saints as an undrafted free agent in 2011. He played college football at Texas.

He has also been a member of the St. Louis Rams, Jacksonville Sharks, Toronto Argonauts, Chicago Bears, Saskatchewan Roughriders and Hamilton Tiger-Cats.

Early years
Chiles attended Mansfield Summit High School in Arlington, Texas where he was coached in football by Kyle Geller.  He was a prep All-American and two-time district 4-5A MVP who was also a four-time honor roll student.    During his four years in high school, he was a starter for three years; at both quarterback and wide receiver.  In his final two years in high school, he totaled 2,036 yards passing, 694 yards receiving, 1,248 yards rushing.  He was invited to play in the 2007 U.S. Army All-American Bowl.

Chiles was a highly touted recruit out of high school.  ESPN and Dave Campbell's Texas Football listed him on their top recruits list. Athlon Sports listed him at wide receiver position and ranked him the 31st best recruit in 2007.

Besides playing football, Chiles also lettered three years in basketball and two years in track and field.

College career
Chiles moved from QB to WR for the Longhorns 2009 Spring Game. He played 4 years for the University of Texas.

Professional career

New Orleans Saints
He was signed by the New Orleans Saints, after the lockout, in August 2011. He was waived on August 30.

St. Louis Rams
Chiles was signed to the St. Louis Rams practice squad on November 30, 2011.

Toronto Argonauts
On May 10, 2013, Chiles signed with the Toronto Argonauts of the Canadian Football League.

Chicago Bears
On January 27, 2015, Chiles was signed by the Chicago Bears to a reserve/future contract. He was waived/injured on August 30, 2015.

Saskatchewan Roughriders
On February 9, 2016, Chiles signed with the Saskatchewan Roughriders. He was released by the team on August 24, 2016.

Hamilton Tiger-Cats
On September 1, 2016, Chiles signed with the Hamilton Tiger-Cats

References

External links
Texas Longhorns bio
Toronto Argonauts bio

1988 births
Living people
American football wide receivers
Canadian football wide receivers
American football quarterbacks
African-American players of American football
African-American players of Canadian football
Players of American football from Dallas
Players of Canadian football from Dallas
Texas Longhorns football players
New Orleans Saints players
Jacksonville Sharks players
Toronto Argonauts players
Chicago Bears players
Saskatchewan Roughriders players
Hamilton Tiger-Cats players
People from Mansfield, Texas
21st-century African-American sportspeople
20th-century African-American people